Plenty Valley FM 88.6 is a community radio station based in Melbourne, Australia. It is broadcast on 88.6 MHz FM. It began transmission in 1987.

It is licensed by the Australian Broadcasting Authority to broadcast within guidelines prescribed by the Community Broadcasting Association of Australia.

Plenty Valley FM's studios are based in the northern Melbourne suburb of Mill Park, and broadcasts to areas within the City of Banyule, City of Manningham, City of Whittlesea and the Shire of Nillumbik.

Northern Football Netball League
Plenty Valley FM broadcasts the Northern Football League Match of the Day each Saturday during the winter football season from 1pm to 5pm. The program kicks off with a one-hour preview of the day's upcoming fixtures across all three senior divisions of the NFNL, after which the award-winning commentary team presents a live broadcast of the weekend's selected feature match that includes score updates throughout the afternoon from the other competitions on the day.

See also
 List of radio stations in Australia

External links
 Plenty Valley FM 

Radio stations in Melbourne